The Akaflieg Stuttgart fs24, nicknamed Phönix (German: "Phoenix"), was a glider designed and built in West Germany from 1951.

Design and development
The fs24 was the first glider to use fibreglass in its construction. The development of modern aerofoil sections for gliders required very accurate reproduction with smooth surfaces, using tolerances that were extremely difficult to achieve using conventional wood or metal construction, but could be achieved by using composite materials laid up in a mould.

The design of the fs24 was started at Akaflieg Stuttgart, (Akademische Fliegergruppe - academic flying group), by Richard Eppler and Hermann Nägele in 1951. Originally it was constructed of balsa wood with a strengthened outer layer of paper and glue layers, which proved unsatisfactory. The project was abandoned until a grant for further research was received from the state of Baden-Württemberg. By then glass fibre reinforced polyester resin was available and so it was redesigned using a balsa wood/glass fibre sandwich, with the load-bearing points and the edge of the cockpit canopy strengthened with plywood.

The first flight was made on 27 November 1957, and good performance and excellent handling were demonstrated, especially in weak thermal conditions. The prototype had a conventional tail unit and a bumper instead of a conventional undercarriage. Airbrakes were fitted on the underside of the wing trailing edges.

Bölkow built eight fs24s, designated Phönix T, differing in the use of a T-tail and retractable undercarriage.

Variants
fs24 Phönix
16m sailplane certified in January 1959 and manufactured by Akademische Fliegergruppe Stuttgart
fs24 Phönix TO
16m sailplane with a T-tail certified in May 1960 and manufactured by Apparatebau Nabern.
fs24 Phönix T
16m sailplane certified in April 1961 and manufactured by Apparatebau Nabern.

Surviving aircraft
The prototype fs24 Phönix is on display at the Deutsches Museum in Munich, Germany.

D-8353 is part of the collection of the Deutsches Segelflugmuseum at Wasserkuppe, Germany.

Specifications

See also

References

Notes

Bibliography

External links

Akaflieg Stuttgart website

1950s German sailplanes
Mid-wing aircraft
Aircraft first flown in 1957
Glider aircraft
Akaflieg Stuttgart aircraft